The 2010 Los Angeles County Board of Supervisors elections were held on June 8, 2010, coinciding with the California gubernatorial election, 2010. Two of the five seats (for the First and Third Districts) of the Los Angeles County Board of Supervisors were contested in this election. None of the incumbents were termed out.

Results

First District 

 

The incumbent, Gloria Molina, ran unopposed.

Third District 

 

The incumbent, Zev Yaroslavsky, ran unopposed.

References

External links 
Los Angeles County Department of Registrar-Recorder/County Clerk

Los Angeles County Board of Supervisors
Los Angeles County Board of Supervisors elections
Los Angeles County